Larry Johnson may refer to:

Sports

American football
 Larry Johnson (running back) (born 1979), American football running back
 Larry Johnson (linebacker) (1909–1972), American football linebacker
 Larry Johnson (American football coach) (born c. 1952), American football coach

Other sports
Larry Johnson (baseball) (1950–2013), American baseball player
Larry Johnson (basketball, born 1969), American basketball player, nicknamed "Grandmama"
Larry Johnson (basketball, born 1954), American basketball player
Larry Johnson (wrestler), American professional wrestler, best known as Sonny King

Other people
Larry Johnson (film producer) (1947–2010), American filmmaker
Larry Johnson (musician) (1938–2016), American blues singer and guitarist
Larry C. Johnson, American political commentator and former CIA analyst
Laurence F. Johnson (born 1950), American futurist, author, and educator
Larry Johnson (author) (born 1960), American author of the book Frozen
Larry R. Johnson (1944–1998), American meteorologist
Larry Johnson (artist), American artist

See also
Larry Johnston (born 1943), ice hockey player
Lawrence Johnson (disambiguation)